In embryology, Carnegie stages are a standardized system of 23 stages used to provide a unified developmental chronology of the vertebrate embryo.

The stages are delineated through the development of structures, not by size or the number of days of development, and so the chronology can vary between species, and to a certain extent between embryos.  In the human being only the first 60 days of development are covered; at that point, the term embryo is usually replaced with the term fetus.

It was based on work by Streeter (1942) and O'Rahilly and Müller (1987). The name "Carnegie stages" comes from the Carnegie Institution of Washington.

While the Carnegie stages provide a universal system for staging and comparing the embryonic development of most vertebrates, other systems are occasionally used for the common model organisms in developmental biology, such as the Hamburger–Hamilton stages in the chick.

Stages
Days are approximate and reflect the days since the last ovulation before pregnancy ("Postovulatory age").

Stage 1: 1 days
 fertilization
 polar bodies

Carnegie stage 1 is the unicellular embryo. This stage is divided into three substages.

Stage 1 a
Primordial embryo. All the genetic material necessary for a new individual, along with some redundant chromosomes, are present within a single plasmalemma. Penetration of the fertilising sperm allows the oocyte to resume meiosis and the polar body is extruded.

Stage 1 b
Pronuclear embryo. Two separate haploid components are present - the maternal and paternal pronuclei. The pronuclei move towards each other and eventually compress their envelopes where they lie adjacent near the centre of the wall.

Stage 1 c
Syngamic embryo. The last phase of fertilisation. The pronuclear envelopes disappear and the parental chromosomes come together in a process called syngamy.

Stage 2: 2-3 days
 cleavage
 morula
 compaction

Carnegie stage 2 begins when the zygote undergoes its first cell division, and ends when the blastocyst forms a cavity and comprises more than 16 cells. At this point, it is called a morula.

The cleavage divisions of CS2 embryos do not occur synchronously. And the fate of the blastomeres is not yet determined.

The two-cell embryo is spherical and surrounded by the transparent zona pellucida. Each of the blastomeres that form is also spherical.

On approximately day 3, at the eight-cell stage, compaction usually begins.

Stage 3: 4-5 days
 blastocyst and blastocoele
 trophoblast and embryoblast

Carnegie stage 3 begins when a cavity first appears in the morula and ends after the hatching from the zona pellucida when the embryo makes contact with the endometrial lining of the uterus.

There are only two stage 3 embryos in the Carnegie collection.

There are four characteristic processes that CS3 embryos go through cavitation, collapse and expansion, hatching, and discarding of cells.

Cavitation
The initiation of cavitation indicates the start of CS3. This process leads to the differentiation of blastocysts into outer trophoblast cells and inner embryoblasts.

Collapse and expansion
This process is seen in vitro and it is not known whether this occurs in vivo. In vitro, the blastocyst rapidly collapses and slowly re-expands before hatching from the zona pellucida.

Hatching
During this process, the blastocyst breaks through and escapes from the zona pellucida. This process must occur prior to implantation into the endometrium.

Discarding of cells
TEM inspection of in vitro blastocysts has allowed us to identify two types of cells that the developing embryo apparently discards. These are sequestered cells and isolated cells. Sequestered cells are groups of cells that are located in between the zona pellucida and the trophoblast. Isolated cells are mainly found in the blastocystic cavity.

Stage 4: 6 days
 syncytiotrophoblast
 cytotrophoblast
 amniotic ectoderm

Stage 5 (a-c): 7-12 days
 implantation
 bilaminar embryonic disc
 primary yolk sac
 amniotic cavity

Stage 6: c. 17 days
 primitive streak
 primitive groove
 chorionic villi
 secondary yolk sac
 early gastrulation

Stage 7: c. 19 days
 gastrulation
 neural plate
 start of hematopoiesis
 notochord

Stage 8: c. 23 days
 primitive pit

Stage 9: c. 25 days
 neural groove
 neural folds
 septum transversum
 placode
 early heart

Stage 10: c. 28 days
 pharyngeal arches #1 and #2
 cardiac loop
 intermediate mesoderm

Stage 11: c. 29 days
 sinus venosus
 mesonephric duct

Stage 12: c. 30 days
 upper limb buds

Stage 13: c. 32 days
 septum primum
 foramen primum

Stage 14: c. 33 days
 ureteric bud

Stage 15: c. 36 days
Development of the Olfactory nerve and the early stage foot and hand plates

Stage 16: c. 39 days
 lower limb buds

Stage 17: c. 41 days
 implementation embryo in posterior uterus wall

Stage 18: c. 44 days
 septum secundum

Stage 19: c. 46 days
Ectoderm: sensory placodes, lens pit, otocyst, nasal pits moved ventrally, fourth ventricle of brain
Mesoderm: heart prominence, ossification continues
Head: forebrain, eye, external acoustic meatus
Body: straightening of trunk, heart, liver, umbilical cord

Stage 20: c. 49  days
Ectoderm: sensory placodes, lens pit, otocyst, nasal pits moved ventrally, fourth ventricle of brain

Mesoderm: heart prominence, ossification continues

Head: forebrain, eye, external acoustic meatus
hearing - otic capsule connected with the basal plate and with the future exoccipitals. Tip of the cochlea is elongated and curled. 
Tensor tympani and stapedius present.

Stage 21: c. 51days
Ectoderm: sensory placodes, nasal pits moved ventrally, fourth ventricle of brain
Mesoderm: heart prominence, ossification continues

Head: nose, eye, external acoustic meatus

Body: straightening of trunk, heart, liver, umbilical cord

Limb: upper limbs longer and bent at elbow, foot plate with digital rays begin to separate, wrist, hand plate with webbed digits

Stage 22: c. 53 days
Mesoderm: heart prominence, ossification continues

Head: nose, eye, external acoustic meatus

Body: straightening of trunk, heart, liver, umbilical cord

Limb: upper limbs longer and bent at elbow, foot plate with webbed digits, wrist, hand plate with separated digits

Stage 23: c. 56 days
final embryonic stage, after this development is described as "fetal" through the entire second and third trimester.

Mesoderm: ossification continues

Head: eyelids, external ears, rounded head

Body: straightening of trunk, intestines herniated at umbilicus

Limbs: hands and feet turned inward

See also
 Mammalian embryogenesis

External links
 
 UNSW Embryology - Carnegie Stages
 Overview at umich.edu
 Details on stages at lsuhsc.edu
 List of structures by week, at mrc.ac.uk
 Diagrams at actual size at Visible Embryo
 Virtual human embryo detailing stages

References

 Hill, M.A. (2016) Embryology Carnegie Stages. Retrieved August 19, 2016, from https://embryology.med.unsw.edu.au/embryology/index.php/Carnegie_Stages

Embryology